The dangjeok is a small end blown bamboo flute used in traditional Korean music.  Slightly smaller than its close instrument relative, the junggeum, the dangjoek is of Chinese origin. Its name, derived from the Chinese Tang Dynasty, dangjeok translates to "Tang end blown bamboo flute." The dangjeok is an aerophone which gives off a clear and bright sound, and has a limited one and a half octave range according to the ancient Korean music treatise, the akhakgwebeom. It is often played accompanied by the Korean lute and xylophone.  Remodeled to enhance range, it is made of yellow bamboo or sick bamboo, and possesses a single end-blowing notch, and seven holes to control pitch, though the seventh hole is not used. Of traditional and current instruments of Korean origin, the dangjeok has the highest pitch.

References

External links
Dangjeok page
Dangjeok page

Listening
Dangjeok audio

See also
Daegeum
Junggeum
Sogeum
Traditional Korean musical instruments
Korean music

Korean musical instruments
Side-blown flutes
Bamboo flutes